Edward Cobden, D.D. (1684-1764) was a British divine, poet, and Archdeacon of London, from 1742–1764.

Life
He was born early in 1684, was educated and took a B. A. degree at Trinity College, Oxford; removing to King's College, Cambridge, he proceeded to M.A. in 1713, and again changed to Oxford for his B.D. and D.D. degrees, the last being taken in 1723.

Bishop Gibson, to whom he was chaplain, gave him the prebend of Erpingham in Lincoln Cathedral in 1721, the prebend of Buckden in 1726, resigned 1727; a prebend in St. Paul's, the united rectories of St. Austin and St. Faith, with that of Acton, Middlesex, in 1730; the chaplaincy to George II, 1730; and the archdeaconry of London, in which he succeeded Dr. Tyrwhitt, in 1742.

He published nine sermons separately. One, delivered at St. James's before George II in 1748, led eventually to the resignation of his chaplaincy. He published it in self-defence in 1749, under the title 'A Persuasive to Chastity.' It had been censured, and the preacher had been lampooned in a court ballad]. Dr. Whiston calls it 'that seasonable and excellent sermon' delivered 'when crime between the sexes was at its greatest height.' In 1748, he published a volume entitled 'Poems on several Occasions,' London, 8vo, printed for the widow of a clergyman, formerly his curate. In this work he eulogises Stephen Duck's poetic fame, glorifies somebody's squirrel and a lady's canary, and laments over a dead cow.

He fell from his horse in 1749, and seriously impaired his memory. In 1751, he was elected president of Sion College, and in 1752 resigned his warrant for chaplain. He says all his preferments together did not amount to £350. a year clear. Soon after he met with losses of £2,000.

Addison,' London, 1720, 8vo. In 1753, appeared 'Concio ad Clerum,' and in 1755 'An Essay tending to promote Religion,' London, 8vo, a curious piece, half prose, half verse, clearly showing his disappointment at not having a canonry of St. Paul's to add to the archdeaconry. He speaks of his chaplaincy, and affirms that the sum total of reward received for his twenty-two years' service was one meal a fortnight and no salary. In 1756, he published 'A Poem sacred to the Memory of Queen Anne for her Bounty to the Clergy,' London, 4to. In 1757, he published a collection called 'Twenty-eight Discourses on various Subjects and Occasions,' London, 4to, and the next year, when residing at Acton, he republished the whole of his works, under the title of 'Discourses and Essays in Prose and Verse by Edward Cobden, D.D., arch-deacon of London, and lately chaplain,' &c.

Cobden died on 22 April 1764. His wife, a daughter of the Rev. Mr. Jessop of Tempsford, Bedfordshire, died in 1762.

References

Attribution

1684 births
1764 deaths
Alumni of Trinity College, Oxford
Alumni of King's College, Cambridge
Archdeacons of London